Aristotelia rufinotella is a moth of the family Gelechiidae. It was described by Pierre Chrétien in 1922. It is found in Morocco.

References

Moths described in 1922
Aristotelia (moth)
Moths of Africa